Hostile Whirlwinds is a 1953 Soviet historical film directed by Mikhail Kalatozov based on a screenplay by Nikolai Pogodin.

Plot summary
Film portrays the first years of Soviet government, biography of Felix Dzerzhinsky in 1918–1921.

In 1956 the film was re-released without scenes with Joseph Stalin.

This film explores a complex time between a relationship of two severely stern Soviet lovers who explore a complicated relationship. Some themes that occur during this film are resilience, the need for violence in difficult circumstances, and how physical relationships affect actual issues. This movie is symbolically sensual and takes great interpretation to understand the true meaning of this relationship. This substory occurs in the midst of several tragic events. It is rumoured that this story had a direct connection to the actual events of Joseph Stalin's third cousin's wife's best friend and how Stalin may have communicated through morse code to the film directors. This film is underrated, yet its dark back-meaning is important in understanding how relationships are similar and different.

Cast 
 Mikhail Kondratyev as Vladimir Lenin
 Vladimir Yemelyanov as Felix Dzerzhinsky
 Leonid Lyubashevsky as Yakov Sverdlov
 Vladimir Solovyov as Mikhail Kalinin
 Ivan Lyubeznov
 Alla Larionova
 Viktor Avdyushko
 Georgi Yumatov
 Vladimir Boriskin
 Oleg Zhakov
 Nikolai Gritsenko
 Andrei Popov
 Mikheil Gelovani as Joseph Stalin (scenes later deleted)
 Klara Luchko

Title origin
The film takes its title from a line in the  popular Polish revolutionary song Whirlwinds of Danger (Warszawianka, To The Barricades, Hostile Whirlwinds hover above us.../«Вихри враждебные реют над нами...») and the Russian translation of it made by Gleb Krzhizhanovsky.

External links

1953 films
1950s biographical drama films
Soviet biographical drama films
Russian biographical drama films
1950s historical drama films
Soviet historical drama films
Russian historical drama films
Mosfilm films
Russian Civil War films
Films set in 1918
Films set in 1919
Films set in 1920
Films set in 1921
Films directed by Mikhail Kalatozov
1950s Russian-language films
1953 drama films